Patrick Rocek (born 29 December 1998) is an Italian world champion rower.  He won the 2022 world championship title in the Italian men's lightweight quad scull after earlier winning gold that season at the 2022 European Rowing Championships.

References

External links

1998 births
Living people
Italian male rowers
21st-century Italian people
20th-century Italian people
World Rowing Championships medalists for Italy